Alberto Soto Maldonado (born 17 March 2001) is a Spanish professional footballer who plays as a midfielder for Atlético Madrid B.

Career

In 2020, Soto was sent on loan to Spanish third division side La Nucía from Atlético Madrid. In 2021, he was sent on loan to Canadian team Atlético Ottawa. On 22 July 2021, he debuted for Atlético Ottawa during a 2–4 loss to Pacific FC.

References

External links
 
 

2001 births
Living people
Association football midfielders
Spanish footballers
People from San Sebastián de los Reyes
Spanish expatriate footballers
Expatriate soccer players in Canada
Spanish expatriate sportspeople in Canada
Atlético Madrid footballers
CF La Nucía players
Atlético Ottawa players
Segunda División B players
Canadian Premier League players